Natalia Ghilzon (born May 18, 1990) is a Canadian professional golfer.

Background and family
Ghilzon is the daughter of Jim Ghilzon and Carla Fantazzi. Her father, Jim, is an orthodontist who has a private practice in Windsor, Ontario.

Golf career
Ghilzon started finding interest in the game at the early age of three. By the time she reached age eleven, she started competing in golf tournaments, defeating opponents who were three and four years older. She competed in the CN Canadian Tour event at Ambassador Golf Club on June 17 to June 19, 2013.

Television
Ghilzon was a contestant on the Big Break Atlantis during 2012.

Personal life
She attended Oakland University and graduated with a degree in Exercise Science with a concentration in Health and Nutrition.

References

External links

Canadian female golfers
Golfing people from Ontario
Sportspeople from London, Ontario
Sportspeople from Windsor, Ontario
1987 births
Living people
21st-century Canadian women